Zivko Aeronautics Inc. is an aeronautics manufacturer specializing in composite prototyping and design for aviation. The company was founded in 1987 by William and Judith Zivko and is located at the  Guthrie–Edmond Regional Airport northeast of Oklahoma City.

Zivko is best known for its Zivko Edge 540 aerobatic aircraft.  It also designs and manufactures a variety of housings for use in a range of aviation-related areas and provide design, fabrication and other services.

References 
About Zivko Aeronautics Inc. Last accessed December 2017.
Budd Davisson  "PIREP: Zivko Edge 540" Air bum March 1995.  Last accessed 18 February 1997.

External links

 

Aircraft manufacturers of the United States
Companies based in Oklahoma
Companies established in 1987
Logan County, Oklahoma